The Take Us Alive World Tour was a concert tour by hard rock band Extreme, taking place in from mid to late 2008, in support of Saudades de Rock, their first album of original material in 13 years, and the first since their reunion in 2007. It was considered their reunion tour, and their first full-scale world tour together since 1995. It was also the band's first tour with new drummer, Kevin Figueiredo.

The band began the North American leg with a performance at the Rocklahoma in Pryor, Oklahoma, on July 11, with the official headlining North American leg beginning on July 29, supported by King's X, with Living Colour also supporting on one date. Most of the European leg was supported by Voodoo Six the London-based UK rock band formed by former Dirty Deeds bass player and producer Tony Newton, and The Duvals, with Hot Leg and The Duvals supporting on all UK dates.

Various covers were played during the tour including Led Zeppelin's "Communication Breakdown", Queen's "Nevermore" and James Brown's "Mother Popcorn".

Set list

Tour dates

Personnel
Gary Cherone - lead vocals
Nuno Bettencourt - lead guitar, vocals
Pat Badger - bass, backing vocals
Kevin Figueiredo - drums, percussion

References

2008 concert tours